Hubert Earle is a Canadian boxing referee and boxing judge, born in Halifax, Nova Scotia, Canada. Earle's career has spanned from 1980 to the present. According to BoxRec, the Nova Scotian boxing official has judged 100s of bouts and reffed over 300 bouts in local boxing rings and venues all over the world. Earle was the first Canadian boxing referee to officiate a main bout at Madison Square Garden. He officiated Joe Calzaghe vs. Roy Jones Jr. in 2008.

Early life
Hubert Earle was born and raised in Halifax, Nova Scotia in Canada.

As a young man, Hubert would attend boxing matches at the Halifax Forum which was his inspiration to become a boxing official.

Career
To become a referee, Earle spent three years working with Bobby Beaton, whom he refers to as a mentor. Hubert Earle's career as a boxing referee and boxing judge would begin in 1980. He would referee his first two bouts on the same night on September 24, 1980, at the Halifax Metro Centre in Halifax, Nova Scotia, Canada. A month and a half later, Earle would go on to judge his first bout on November 11, 1980, at the Halifax Metro Centre in Halifax, Nova Scotia, Canada.

In the early 1980s, he officiated fights for well-known Nova Scotian fighters including Ricky Anderson, Cedric Parsons, Chris Clarke, Ralph Hollet, and others.

He served as the referee-in-chief for both the Canadian Pro Boxing Federation and the Nova Scotia Boxing Authority during his career.

Beginning in 1989 and 1990, Hubert Earle officiated and judged his first World Boxing Association-sanctioned fights. During his tenure with the WBA, he officiated numerous of world boxing championships.

In the early 2000s, he had judged the likes of notable fighters such as Shane Mosley, Winky Wright, and Oscar De La Hoya. On November 20, 2004, he judged the Winky Wright and Shane Mosley II bout for the WBA/WBC Super Welterweight Championship at Mandalay Bay in Las Vegas, Nevada. Wright prevailed with a majority decision, and Earle was the judge who gave it a draw.

In 2008, Earle was appointed as a referee by the New York State Athletic Commission. He holds the distinction of being the first Canadian referee to oversee a main bout at Madison Square Garden. On November 8, 2008, he officiated a world-title bout between Roy Jones Jr. and undefeated Joe Calzaghe in New York City.

Earle's officiating career spans from 1980 to 2022. According to BoxRec, the Nova Scotian boxing official has judged 100s of bouts and reffed over 300 bouts. He has officiated in local boxing rings and venues all over the world, including the United States, Germany, South Africa, Japan, Thailand, Mexico, the United Kingdom, Indonesia, Australia, France, Finland, Venezuela, Italy, Nicaragua, Panama, South Korea, and Ireland.

In 2020, Earle resigned from the World Boxing Association after 40 years as an international boxing official to work as the Director of Combat Sports and President of the ring officials in Nova Scotia.

Honors and awards
 In 2011, Earle was inducted into the Nova Scotia Sport Hall of Fame in Halifax, Nova Scotia.

 In 2013, he was inducted into the Sackville Sports Hall of Fame in his hometown of Nova Scotia, where he also served as president from 2016 until 2019.

References

Boxing judges
Boxing referees
Boxing people
Black Nova Scotians
Year of birth missing (living people)
Living people